The Middlesex County 4-H Fife & Drum Corps is fife and drum corps, which was formed in 1972 as a 4-H club in Concord, Massachusetts, in anticipation of that town’s celebration of the United States bicentennial. Its members come from different towns in eastern Massachusetts and New Hampshire. Members range in age from eight to eighteen.

History of fifes and drums

As with other modern fife and drum groups, the Middlesex County 4-H Fife & Drum Corps perpetuates the centuries-old tradition of fife and drum music. With its roots traced back to Switzerland in the 13th century, the military's use of fifes and drums as a means of communication spread to other European countries, finding its way to America as countries such as France and Britain colonized the New World.

In the United States, fifes and drums were used through the Civil War, finally being replaced by the bugle as technology and mechanization changed the nature of warfare. Beginning around the United States' centennial, civilian groups picked up and continued the fife and drum tradition in places like New England. In more recent years, the fife and drum tradition has been revived in other parts of the United States such as Virginia, the Midwest, and the West Coast. Today, fife and drum corps can mostly be found on the East Coast from Virginia to New England, with a concentration of groups in Connecticut.

4-H youth Empowerment 

Youth leadership is the cornerstone of 4-H. This makes the Middlesex County 4-H Fife & Drum Corps somewhat unusual among youth fife and drum corps, in that the youth members take on most of the leadership roles. They make decisions about music and presentation, they determine the program for each event, and they work with adult event organizers during events. During a performance, the youth leaders make all decisions of when to play, what to play, and where to march, without assistance from adults. Other leadership opportunities include running the fife or drum line, helping teach the beginners, checking uniforms, and mentoring new members. As a teaching group, members learn music, American history, leadership, and are taught to present themselves in a professional and disciplined manner.

Uniforms and instrumentation 
 
The uniform of the corps is green and white, the official colors of the national 4-H organization. The style of the uniform—cocked hats, relatively short vented waistcoats, fall-front breeches, buttoned haversacks, canteens, and leather garters—is based on styles worn in New England in the 1770s.

The corps uses six hole Cooperman fifes, snare, and bass drums.

Performance 

The Middlesex County 4-H Fife & Drum Corps primarily plays music of the 18th century. 
The corps plays at musters, Military tattoos, and other events, including the 2004 Democratic National Convention in Boston.

Recordings 

 Middlesex County 4-H Fife & Drum Corps (2008)

References 

 Brown, Howard Mayer, and Frank, Jaap, et al. "Fife." The New Grove Dictionary of Music and Musicians, ed. Stanley Sadie, Vol. 8. NY: Oxford University Press, 2001.

External links 
 Middlesex County 4-H Fife & Drum Corps Official Website
 Colonial Williamsburg Fife and Drum
 Middlesex County Volunteers Fifes and Drums
 The Old Guard Fife and Drum
 1st Michigan Colonial Fife and Drum
 The Company of Fifers & Drummers
 National 4-H Organization

American instrumental musical groups
4-H
Fife players
Musical groups from Massachusetts
Concord, Massachusetts
Musical groups established in 1972
1972 establishments in Massachusetts